Joseph Ainslie Bear (May 28, 1878 – July 13, 1955) was an American banker who co-founded the investment bank Bear Stearns.

Biography
Bear was born to a Jewish family on May 28, 1878 in Louisville, Kentucky.  He was educated in France, Germany, and Switzerland. He worked at the bond trading firm J.J. Danzig where he met Harold C. Mayer and Robert B. Stearns. In 1923, they founded Bear Stearns with $500,000 in capital.

His first wife was Julia Pam, sister of judge Hugo Pam.

References

1878 births
1955 deaths
Businesspeople from Louisville, Kentucky
Jewish American bankers
American bankers
Bear Stearns people